is a collection of illustrations (most containing no dialogue) by . Himura has posted an illustration on his Twitter account every Monday starting from February 2015.  An original net animation (ONA) adaptation by Pine Jam aired from October to December 2016.  A second season by Cloud Hearts aired from September to December 2021. A manga adaptation began in Kodansha's Weekly Young Magazine in November 2020.

Plot
The story revolves around an ample-breasted high school student named Ai who has a chance meeting with a salaryman on a train and they strike up a friendship. They meet every Monday on the train where they chat and the salaryman serves as her chaperone during the crowded commute.

Concept
This project was initially called  before Himura gave its current name after the 46th illustration, and has since posted more than 200 illustrations. These illustrations are colored in a blue monochrome theme. The initial purpose of these illustrations was to provide a positive motivation towards workers and students alike on Monday mornings, as the role of students and workers are reflected through the characters Ai and the salaryman, respectively. Besides Ai, the stories of other various girls and men are also illustrated every Monday. So far, the first volume illustration compilation book that also includes comic was released on December 31, 2015, at Comic Market 89. The second volume was released at Comic Market 90 and the third volume was released at Comic Market 91, all has been published by Himura himself.

Characters

Ai is a high school student who, despite being slender, has big breasts. She used to suffer from low self-esteem as her breasts attract attention from men around her and has been trying to hide them. Because of her duty as the class president, she has to come to school earlier than everyone else every Monday, and has to ride the train during its rush hour. That is when she met the salaryman who shields her from the crowds every time they met and helped her gaining more confidence in her own body. Her nickname comes from the fact that her breast size is I cup. However,  recently the size seems to be getting even bigger.

 A salaryman who shields Ai from the crowded train every Monday morning. Every week, Ai gives him a weekly charm, which are mostly buttons popped off from her shirts. His niece is coincidentally Ai's best friend.

 A clumsy, but reliable office woman. She works for a trading company. Junior loves cats and often come to Senior's house as he is keeping a cat.

 Junior's senior at trading company. He is the one who is taking care of Junior when she gets out of control with her alcohol. He is keeping a cat named "Fumi-chan."

 A freshman college girl who now lives with Teacher in his apartment after her feelings were finally reciprocated by him ever since her love confession on first year in high school. She refers to Teacher as Sensei when she calls him.
 Maegami is not her realname. This nickname comes from her hairstyle, with the bangs covers her eyes.

 Ai's best friend, who is popular with both boys and girls. She is Salaryman's niece and often teases Ai-chan about her breasts and at the same time, is very protective of her.

 A male teacher who Maegami has liked since her first year of high school and who was having trouble accepting her love confession due to school regulations. He finally revealed his true feelings after she came back to him even after her graduation. He and Maegami are now living together, coincidentally next to Salary man's house and moving next to Ai-chan's house not long after their wedding engagement.

 A high school cheerleader who instantly becomes popular and become a model after she gets featured in media due to her body.

 The childhood friend of Cheerleader who became conscious of her after he learned the differences between boys and girls.

 A gym trainer who occasionally accompanies Chief Manager at the gym.

 
 Salaryman's boss.

 
 A worker at a minimarket.

 
 Ai-chan's younger sister who now studies at Ai-chan's high school as first year student. She also has a good figure like Ai-chan's.

 
 Mother to Ai-chan and her sister. She is always having trouble, due to having to fix the buttons that have popped off of Imōto-chan and Ai-chan's clothes due to their large breasts.

 A graduate student and researcher at an unnamed university. She is a close friend of Kouhai-chan.

Media
A twelve episode original net animation (ONA), each episode of four minutes in length, aired from October 10 to December 26, 2016, and were streamed online for free on NBCUniversal Entertainment Japan's official YouTube account for episode 1 and Niconico channel for episode 2 onwards every Monday, following the routine of the original illustrations. Kōsuke Murayama directed the anime, Hiroyuki Yoshii adapted Kiseki Himura's original designs, and Pine Jam produced the series. Sayaka Harada sung the ending theme song titled  under her character name and is digitally released via iTunes Store, Amazon, Oricon Music Store, mora, and Recochoku starting November 14, 2016. Muse Communication licensed the series in South Asia and Southeast Asia.

A Blu-ray and DVD, compiling all 12 episodes, were released at Comic Market 91 (December 29–31, 2016) at NBCUniversal's booth. The DVD includes two new special episodes, with each episode focusing on Junior and Ai.

A second season was announced on September 20, 2021. It premiered on the same day and ended on December 6, 2021. Yuki Ogawa is directing the anime, with Hajime Kamoshida writing the scripts, and Tensho Sato adapting Himura's original designs. Cloud Hearts is producing the second season. Crunchyroll licensed the series outside of Asia.

Episode list

Takedown
A day after NBCUniversal Entertainment Japan posted the first episode, the video was taken down by YouTube, stating that the video violates its Community Guidelines. The author Kiseki Himura apologized to fans on Twitter and that said that the anime will not be reuploaded on YouTube. 2 days later, he announced via his Twitter account that the first episode has been restored and uploaded via the same channel, now under the YouTube account NBCUniversal Anime/Music. Starting from episode 2, the anime is uploaded via Niconico Channel along with the reuploaded first episode.

Season 1

Season 2

Manga adaptation
A manga adaptation began in Kodansha's seinen manga magazine Weekly Young Magazine on November 16, 2020. The manga is released in two versions: the standard edition and the blue monochrome edition that stays true to the original style of the series. Kodansha released its first collected tankōbon volume on April 5, 2021. As of August 1, 2022, five volumes have been released. During their Otakon 2022 panel, Denpa announced their license to the manga.

Volume list

See also
Just Because! - original animation collaboration between Kiseki Himura and The Pet Girl of Sakurasou's author Hajime Kamoshida.

Notes

References

External links
Kiseki Himura's Twitter account 
Getsuyōbi no Tawawa at Niconico Channel 
Manga serialization page at Young Magazine 

2016 anime ONAs
2021 anime ONAs
2016 web series debuts
Crunchyroll anime
Japanese comic strips
Kodansha manga
Muse Communication
NBCUniversal Entertainment Japan
Pine Jam
Seinen manga
Twitter
Yokohama Animation Laboratory